Earthnut is a common name for several unrelated plants which produce a subterranean edible seed, fruit or root

Earthnut may refer to:
 Truffle
 Peanut
 Roots and tubers:
 Lathyrus tuberosus
 Conopodium majus
 Bunium persicum

See also 
 Groundnut (disambiguation)